Olaf Rye (16 November 1791 – 6 July 1849) was a Norwegian-Danish military officer. He died in battle during the First Schleswig War and is considered to have been a Danish war hero.

Biography
Olaf Rye was born at  Bø in Telemark, Norway. He was raised on the Nerbø farm. He was one of the sons of Matthias Andreas Rye  (1793–1860) and Elisabeth Johanne Lind. His father was a captain  and battalion manager of the  Telemark Infantry Regiment  (Telemarkens Infanteriregiment). His brother Johan Henrik Rye (1787–1868) was a jurist and civil servant.

In 1804, he started his military career as a cadet with the Norwegian Cadastre Corps in Kristiania (now Oslo). In 1813,  he was appointed captain.
He left Norway in 1815 and enlisted in the service of the Prussian General Gebhard Leberecht von Blücher. 
In 1817, Rye re-joined the Fynian Infantry Regiment of the Royal Danish Army. 
From 1819 to 1842, he was assigned to the Oldenborg Regiment.
He was nominated for knighthood in the Order of the Dannebrog  1840 and was awarded the Dannebrogordenens Hæderstegn in 1848.
In 1849, he served as a major-general and played a decisive role in the Battle of Fredericia which broke the Schleswig-Holstein siege of the town. He died during this battle. He was buried at Garrison Cemetery in Copenhagen.

In his spare time, skiing was his great passion. In November 1808, he reportedly launched himself 9.5 metres in the air in front of an audience of other soldiers at a location near the Eidsberg Church.

Legacy
 Camp Olaf Rye – Danish KFOR camp in Kosovo.
  Ryes Kaserne – One of the two barracks in Fredericia.
Olaf Ryes plass – Square in Oslo, Norway.
 Olaf Ryes vei – Street in Bergen, Norway.
 Ryes gate – Street in Kongsberg, Norway.
 Olaf Ryes Gade – Street in Odense, Denmark.

Ski jumping world record
The first ever world record from first ever mentioned ski jump in history.

References

Note
This article is based on the corresponding articles on the Danish and Norwegian Wikipedias

Related reading
Nick Svendsen (2010) The First Schleswig-Holstein War 1848-50 Helion and Company) 

1791 births
1849 deaths
People from Bø, Telemark
Norwegian Army personnel
Norwegian military personnel of the Napoleonic Wars
Norwegian emigrants to Denmark
Danish generals
Norwegian generals
People of the First Schleswig War
Norwegian male ski jumpers
Danish military personnel killed in action
Norwegian military personnel killed in action
Knights First Class of the Order of the Dannebrog
Burials at the Garrison Cemetery, Copenhagen
Sportspeople from Vestfold og Telemark